Jean Arley is an American television producer of soap operas.

Positions held
Search for Tomorrow
Producer (1985–1986)

Where the Heart Is
 Associate Producer

One Life to Live
 Executive Producer (1983–1984)
Head writer (during the 1981 Writers Guild of America strike)

Awards and nominations

External links

Living people
American television producers
Soap opera producers
American soap opera writers
Year of birth missing (living people)
Place of birth missing (living people)